Patrick Würll (born 16 August 1978) is a German former footballer who played as a striker.

References

External links
 

1978 births
Living people
German footballers
Association football forwards
FC Bayern Munich II players
Kickers Offenbach players
SSV Reutlingen 05 players
VfB Lübeck players
Holstein Kiel players
Dynamo Dresden players
SSV Jahn Regensburg players
2. Bundesliga players
3. Liga players
VfR Garching players
People from Schweinfurt
Sportspeople from Lower Franconia
Footballers from Bavaria